Moshe Ber Beck, or Moshe Dov Beck (May 17, 1934 – April 15, 2021), was a Hungarian-born American rabbi and anti-Zionist campaigner. He was the leader of one of the Neturei Karta branches in the United States.

Biography
Moshe Ber Beck was born in Nyírbogát, Hungary. His early childhood was spent hiding with his brother from Nazi persecution until 1945, when Soviet troops took Budapest. In 1948, he migrated to Bnei Brak, Israel, where he began yeshiva studies. In 1959, he married, and at that time joined Neturei Karta, leaving the Vizhnitz Hasidic movement of which he had formerly been a part. He left Israel in 1970 because, he said, of his strong opposition to Zionism, and subsequently lived in Monsey, New York, where he worked as a rabbi and anti-Zionist activist.

Beck died from complications related to COVID-19 on 15 April 2021. He was 86 years old.

Anti-Zionist campaigning

Moshe Ber Beck, along with other rabbis such as Yisroel Dovid Weiss, was known as a Haredi opponent of Zionism, but like all of Neturei Karta, to an extent which leaves him far beyond the mainstream Haredi viewpoint. He was one of the leaders of Neturei Karta in the U.S. Among other activities, he participated in a visit to Iran in 2006, where he met with President Mahmoud Ahmadinejad to publicize Haredi opposition to Zionism. Beck denounced what he considered a political use of the Holocaust by what he called the Zionist establishment. In 2014, he appeared in a lengthy interview on the documentary, Judaism in the Era of Zionism, in which he laid out his anti-Zionist viewpoint.

Beck's opposition to Zionism is based, he said, upon the works of Joel Teitelbaum, especially Vayoel Moshe, a lengthy work which aims to demonstrate that Jews are commanded by the Torah to remain in exile until redeemed by the messiah, and are therefore prohibited to establish an independent country.

References

External links
 Judaism in the Era of Zionism (A documentary interview with Rabbi Yisroel Dovid Weiss and Rabbi Moshe Dov Beck.)
 Biographical speech by Senior Rabbi Moshe Dov Beck
 Argument of Rabbi Ber Beck about religious jewish opposition to Zionism

1934 births
2021 deaths
American Haredi rabbis
Anti-Zionist Haredi rabbis
Jewish anti-Zionism in the United States
Hungarian emigrants to Israel
Israeli emigrants to the United States
People from Monsey, New York
21st-century American Jews
Deaths from the COVID-19 pandemic in New York (state)